The Woodlark Basin is a geologic structural basin located in the southwestern Pacific Ocean and can be found to the southwest of the island country of Papua New Guinea. The basin is an extensional basin that is actively spreading and has a seafloor spreading center. This basin lies between the Indo-Australian Plate and the Solomon microplate and is located at 09°S, 155°E. The Woodlark Basin has an interesting geologic history dating back twenty million years to the initial opening of the basin; the spreading of the basin, however, has occurred within the past three million years. Due to the relatively young age of the basin, many researchers are interested in learning how the basin will continue to develop over time and how the plates will subduct. The subduction of the plates in the Woodlark Basin will be unique because the new crust being formed will be young and warm unlike most crust that gets subducted due to its low temperature and high density.

Geology
The Indo-Australian plate and the Pacific plate have oblique convergence, which is when two tectonic plates come together and collide at an odd angle rather than head-on. An example of oblique convergence would be if a plate moving north collided with another plate moving east, which would result in a transpressional regime. The overwhelming drag of the overriding Pacific plate caused the Solomon microplate to break away from the Indo-Australian plate, causing a mega shear zone between the two plates. Passive rifting and seafloor spreading in the Woodlark Basin continues to further separate the microplate from the Indo-Australian plate as the Woodlark Basin grows westward along the edge of Papua New Guinea. A distinctive feature of the Woodlark Basin that scientists and researchers are exploring is the transition from continental rifting to sea floor spreading. The Woodlark Basin is one of the only places on Earth where scientists can actively study this transition.

Sediment fill

The Woodlark Basin is very young and only started spreading around 3 million years ago, so that there is very little sediment in the basin relative to most oceanic basins, which can have thousands of meters of sediment fill close to continental margins. The basin has a maximum thickness of 1500 meters of sediment fill in the deepest section of the North Moresby graben, however most of the basin is covered in less than 1000 meters of sediment.  This is great for researchers because different features, such as faults and spreading centers, can easily be seen in satellite images of the basin due to the lack of sediment buildup.

Tectonics

The Woodlark Basin originally began to open as a sphenochasm with a pole near the tip of eastern Papua about 20 million years ago. A sphenochasm is a triangular gap of oceanic crust separating two continental blocks and converging to a point.  This was caused by left-lateral shear in the region induced by a change in the relative motion pole of the Indo-Australian plate and Pacific Plate. The basin opened only a few degrees at this time, then stopped for a period of time. Then the rifting resumed in the entire basin about 3 million years ago, based on magnetic anomaly data. Then about 1 million years ago, the spreading center in the western basin shifted to the Woodlark Rise. The Woodlark Rise is the northern section of the Woodlark Basin that separates the basin from the bordering Soloman sea to the north. This spreading rift marks the southern boundary of the Solomons Plate which is bounded by subduction zones in the north and east (the New Britain and northern Solomons Trenches, respectively) and in the west by a combination strike-slip rifting (dip-slip) boundary in eastern Papua (New Guinea). A vector triangle solution near the Solomons Trench-Woodlark Rift triple point gives underthrusting of the Solomons Plate beneath the northern Solomon Trench in a northeasterly direction at about 11 centimeters per year. Figure 2 shows each of the tectonic plates surrounding the Woodlark Basin along with the relative plate motion and direction that each plate is moving.

Low angle normal faulting

The Woodlark Basin is one of very few places on the earth to have active low angle normal faults. A low angle normal fault is a normal fault that has a dip of less than thirty degrees (dip <30°). This is a topic that is currently debated heavily, the low angle normal fault paradox. Low angle normal faults have been proposed to be a key structural feature for crustal extension. In the Woodlark Basin the active low angle normal faults have a dips between 15°-35°, and are all located in the small range of 150.5° E to 152.5° E.  This is a very interesting area in the Woodlark because it is the area where sea-floor spreading makes the transition to continental rifting. However, some scientist do not believe that low angle normal faults exist actively in the world. They instead believe that the low angle normal faults found are old normal faults that are no longer active and have been rotated to a different orientation. This would make a normal fault look like it was a low angle normal fault that is no longer active.

Sea-floor spreading

The Woodlark Basin is actively spreading in a mostly north and south direction. This is shown in Figure 3 by the red lines that stretch across the middle of the figure. The spreading centers are offset by small transform faults, this is what causes the spreading center to be uneven across the basin.  Also the rate of spreading in the eastern section of the basin is significantly higher than the rate of spreading to the western side of the basin. This statement is easily backed up by satellite imaging, which can be seen in figure 3. This figure helps scientist and researchers to visually notice that the spreading rates across the basin are uneven. As shown in the figure you can see the eastern side of the basin has opened up much faster than the western side. This is only easily visible in satellite imaging due to the relatively small amount of sediment build up in the basin.

Natural resources

The basin is not currently being explored by any large companies seeking to find natural resources. Due to the extremely young age of the Woodlark basin (less than 5 million years old), the basin has not had enough time for significant amounts of natural resources, such as oil and gas, to form.

See also
 Kavachi
 Woodlark Plate

References

Oceanic basins of the Pacific Ocean
Geography of Papua New Guinea
Geology of Papua New Guinea
Geology of the Pacific Ocean
Woodlark Islands